Chiswick Bridge is a reinforced concrete deck arch bridge over the River Thames in West London. It is one of three bridges opened in 1933 as part of an ambitious scheme to relieve traffic congestion west of London. The structure carries the A316 road between Chiswick on the north bank of the Thames and Mortlake on the south bank.

The bridge is built on the site of a former ferry. When the  central span opened it was the longest concrete span over the Thames. The bridge is well known for its proximity to the end of The Championship Course, the stretch of the Thames used for the Boat Race and other rowing events.

Background 

Both areas were sparsely populated, so there was little demand for a fixed river crossing at that point.

With the arrival of railways and the London Underground in the 19th century commuting to London became practical and affordable, and the populations of Chiswick and Mortlake grew rapidly. However, the scheme was abandoned due to costs and arguments between various interested parties over the exact route the road should take.

After the First World War, the population of the west London suburbs continued to grow, thanks to improved rail transport links and the growth in ownership of automobiles. In 1925, the Ministry of Transport convened a conference between Surrey and Middlesex county councils with the aim of reaching a solution to the congestion problem, and the Great Chertsey Road scheme was revived. In 1927, the Royal Commission on Cross-River Traffic approved the scheme to relieve the by then chronic traffic congestion on the existing, mostly narrow, streets in the area, and on the narrow bridges at Richmond Bridge, Kew and Hammersmith. The Ministry of Transport agreed to pay heavy subsidies towards the cost.

A new arterial road, now the A316 road, was given Royal Assent on 3 August 1928, and construction began in 1930. The construction of the road required two new bridges to be built, at Twickenham and Chiswick. The proposal was authorised in 1928 and construction began in the same year. The bridge, along with the newly built Twickenham Bridge and the rebuilt Hampton Court Bridge, was opened by Edward, Prince of Wales on 3 July 1933, and the ferry service was permanently closed.

Design 

The new bridge was designed in reinforced concrete by architect Sir Herbert Baker and engineer Alfred Dryland, with additional input from Considère Constructions, at the time Britain's leading specialist in reinforced concrete construction.

The bridge has concrete foundations supporting a five-arch cellular reinforced concrete superstructure. The deck is supported by a concealed lattice of columns and beams rising from the arched superstructure. The structure is faced with 3,400 tons of Portland stone, except for underneath the arches. At the time it was built, the  central span was the longest concrete span over the Thames.

Unusually for a Thames bridge, only three of Chiswick Bridge's five spans cross the river; the shorter spans at each end of the bridge cross the former towpaths. To allow sufficient clearance for industrial barges yet avoid steep inclines, the approach roads are elevated on embankments.

The bridge was built by the Cleveland Bridge & Engineering Company at a cost of £208,284 (about £ in ). Additional costs such as building the approach roads and buying land brought the total project cost to £227,600 (about £ in ). The Ministry of Transport paid 75% of the cost, with Surrey and Middlesex county councils paying the rest.

The bridge was generally well received. Country Life praised the design as "reflecting in its general design the eighteenth century Palladian tradition of Lord Burlington's famous villa at Chiswick".

Present-day 

Chiswick Bridge is a major transport route, and the eighth busiest of London's 20 Thames road bridges. It is possibly best known for its proximity to the finishing line of The Championship Course, the stretch of the Thames used for the Boat Race and other rowing events. A University Boat Race Stone on the south shore, an urban embankment, faces a brightly painted Cambridge and Oxford blues wooden obelisk.

The towpath under the bridge on the southern bank now forms part of the Thames Path. As at 2009 the northernmost arch was used by the Tideway Scullers sculling (and rowing) club as storage space.

See also 

 List of crossings of the River Thames
 List of bridges in London

Notes and references

Notes

References

Bibliography

External links 

 Panoramic view from Kew towpath

Bridges in London
Bridges across the River Thames
Mortlake, London
Road bridges in England
Transport in the London Borough of Hounslow
Buildings and structures in the London Borough of Hounslow
Transport in the London Borough of Richmond upon Thames
Buildings and structures in the London Borough of Richmond upon Thames
Bridges completed in 1933